Ho Sports Stadium is a stadium in Ho, Ghana. It has 5,000 seats and is home to International Allies F.C.

References

Football venues in Ghana
Volta Region